A list of spy films that are based on books. If a book has been turned into both a film and a TV series (or TV film), then the TV series is included.

French Revolution

Early USA
More to add

World War I
More to add

World War II

 * BBC mini-series
 & pre-WWII

Cold War

* BBC mini-series

In March 2015, shooting wrapped on the film adaptation, Damascus Cover of Howard Kaplan's novel The Damascus Cover set in 1989 at the fall of the Berlin Wall, starring Jonathan Rhys Meyers, John Hurt, Jurgen Prochnow and Olivia Thirlby.

Post-Cold War

See also
 James Bond
 Matt Helm
 Jason Bourne
 Jack Ryan
 Harry Palmer
 Quiller
 George Smiley
 Spy film
 Spy fiction
 Espionage
 List of fiction works made into feature films
 List of films based on war books

Spy books
Spy films